The 2017 Washington State Cougars football team represented Washington State University during the 2017 NCAA Division I FBS football season. The team was coached by sixth-year head coach Mike Leach and played their home games at Martin Stadium in Pullman, Washington. They competed as members of the North Division of the Pac-12 Conference. They finished the season 9–4, 6–3 in Pac-12 play to finish in third place in the North Division. They were invited to the Holiday Bowl where they lost to Michigan State.

Previous season

In 2016, the Cougars went 8–5, 7–2 in Pac-12 play to finish in second place in the North Division. They were invited to the Holiday Bowl, where they were defeated by Minnesota.

Rankings

Schedule
Washington State announced their 2017 football schedule on January 18, 2017. The Cougars started the season with five straight home games. In Pac-12 conference play, they did not play cross-divisional foes Arizona State and UCLA.

Source:

Coaching staff

Source:

Game summaries

vs. Montana State

Sources:

vs. Boise State

Sources: ESPN

vs. Oregon State

Sources:

vs. Nevada

Sources:

vs. USC

Sources: ESPN CBS

at Oregon

Sources:

at California

Sources:

vs. Colorado

Sources:

at Arizona

Sources:

vs. Stanford

Sources:

at Utah

Sources:

at Washington

Sources:

vs Michigan State

Sources:

Awards

2017 Football Roster

Source:

References

Washington State
Washington State Cougars football seasons
Washington State Cougars football